is a Japanese sprinter and hurdler. Between 2013 and 2017 she won two silver medals in the 400 m hurdles and two bronze medals in the 4×400 m relay at the Asian Championships.

References

1991 births
Living people
Japanese female sprinters
Japanese female hurdlers
Japan Championships in Athletics winners
21st-century Japanese women